Brede may refer to:

Places
 Brede, East Sussex, a village near the River Brede
 Brede, Denmark, a suburb of Copenhagen, Denmark

Other uses
 Brede (name)
 Brede Shipspouse, a fictional character created by Julian May; see Saga of Pliocene Exile#The race from Lene
 River Brede, East Sussex, England
 Brede-class lifeboat, operated by the Royal National Lifeboat Institution between 1982 and 2002